Citizen Agreement is a Valencian political coalition formed by United Left of the Valencian Country (EUPV), Republican Left of the Valencian Country (ERPV), The Greens of the Valencian Country (EVPV) and Building the Left–Socialist Alternative (CLI–AS) to contest the 2015 Valencian regional and local elections.

Composition

References

Political party alliances in Spain
Political parties in the Valencian Community